The marine waters of the Houtman Abrolhos, an island chain off the coast of Western Australia, has been recorded as containing 172 species of echinoderm in ?? genera. This extremely high diversity has been attributed to a combination of factors, namely: the position of the Houtman Abrolhos within a biotone between temperate and tropical waters; the wide variety of habitats; and the Leeuwin Current, which both transports tropical species southwards, and keeps the reef warm enough for them to survive. This is a list of echinoderms of the Houtman Abrolhos:

Crinoidea
 Capillaster multiradiatus
 Clarkcomanthus littoralis
 Comanthus alternans
 Comanthus briareus
 Comanthus gisleni
 Comanthus parvicirrus
 Comanthus wahlbergi
 Comanthina variabilis
 Comaster distinctus
 Comatella maculata
 Comatella nigra
 Comatella stelligera
 Comatula pectinata
 Comatula purpurea
 Comatula solaris
 Comatulella brachiolata
 Zygometra comata
 Zygometra elegans
 Decametra studeri
 Petrasometra clarae
 Petrasometra helianthoides
 Amphimetra tessellata
 Lamprometra palmata
 Tropiometra afra
 Ptilometra macronema
 Neometra conaminis
 Antedon parviflora
 Dorometra nana

Asteroidea
 Luidia maculata
 Astropecten granulatus
 Astropecten preissi
 Astropecten triseriatus
 Astropecten vappa
 Astropecten zebra
 Archaster angulatus
 Pentagonaster duebeni
 Stellaster inspinosus
 Goniodiscaster seriatus
 Anthenea australiae
 Anthenea obesa
 Gymnanthenea globigera
 Nectria macrobrachia
 Pentaceraster alveolatus
 Pentaceraster gracilis
 Pentaceraster regulus
 Protoreaster alveolatus
 Asterodiscides culcitulus
 Asterodiscides macroplax
 Asterodiscides soelae
 Petricia vernicina
 Austrofromia polypora
 Bunaster variegatus
 Fromia indica
 Fromia monilis
 Fromia pacifica
 Leiaster leachi
 Linckia guildingi
 Linckia multiflora
 Nardoa galatheae
 Ophidiaster cribrarius
 Metrodira subulata
 Anseropoda rosacea
 Asterina cepheus
 Manasterina longispina
 Nepanthia crassa
 Paranepanthia rosea
 Patiriella brevispina (purple seastar)
 Euretaster insignis
 Echinaster arcystatus
 Echinaster glomeratus
 Echinaster varicolor
 Allostichaster polyplax
 Coscinasterias calamaria (eleven-armed seastar)

Ophiuroidea
 Ophiomyxa australis
 Astrobrachion adhaerens
 Astroboa granulatus
 Astrosierra microconus
 Euryale aspera
 Amphioplus depressus
 Amphipholis squamata
 Amphistigma minuta
 Amphiura brachyactis
 Amphiura constricta
 Amphiura multiremula
 Amphiura nannodes
 Amphiura septemspinosa
 Amphiura velox
 Ophiactis acosmeta
 Ophiactis luteomaculata
 Ophiactis modesta
 Ophiactis resiliens
 Ophiactis savignya
 Ophiactis tricolor
 Macrophiothrix caenosa
 Macrophiothrix paucispina
 Ophiothela danae
 Ophiothrix caespitosa
 Ophiothrix ciliaris
 Ophiothrix spongicola
 Ophiocoma dentata
 Ophiocoma erinaceus
 Ophiocoma occidentalis
 Ophiocoma pusilla
 Ophiocomella sexradia
 Ophionereis dubia
 Ophionereis schayeri
 Ophiarachnella gorgonia
 Ophiarachnella ramsayi
 Ophioconis cincta
 Dictenophiura stellata
 Ophiocrossota multispina
 Ophioplocus imbricatus
 Ophiura kinbergi

Echinoidea
 Phyllacanthus irregularis
 Prionocidaris baculosa
 Prionocidaris bispinosa
 Asthenosoma ijimai
 Asthenosoma varium
 Centrostephanus tenuispinus
 Diadema savignyi
 Diadema setosum (long-spined sea urchin)
 Echinothrix calamaris (double spined urchin)
 Amblypneustes pallidus
 Holopneustes porosissimus
 Salmaciella dussumieri
 Temnopleurus alexandri
 Nudechinus scotiopremnus
 Pseudoboletia indiana
 Tripneustes gratilla
 Echinometra mathaei
 Echinostrephus molaris
 Heliocidaris erythrogramma
 Echinodiscus auritus
 Clypeaster fervens
 Clypeaster reticulatus (cake urchin)
 Peronella lesueuri
 Peronella orbicularis
 Breynia desorii
 Echinocardium cordatum

Holothuroidea
 Actinopyga echinites
 Bohadschia argus
 Holothuria coluber
 Holothuria atra
 Holothuria edulis
 Holothuria pardalis
 Holothuria leucospilota
 Holothuria fuscocinerea
 Holothuria nobilis
 Holothuria difficilis
 Holothuria cinerascens
 Holothuria dofleini
 Holothuria pervicax
 Holothuria michaelseni
 Holothuria arenicola
 Holothuria hartmeyeri
 Holothuria hilla
 Holothuria impatiens
 Stichopus horrens
 Stichopus ludwigi
 Stichopus mollis
 Stichopus monotuberculatus
 Stichopus variegatus
 Paracaudina tetrapora
 Cucumaria bicolor
 Cucumella mutans
 Pentacta anceps
 Pentacta crassa
 Pentacta quadrangularis
 Thyone papuensis
 Cladolabes hamatus
 Synaptula recta
 Leptosynapta dolabrifera (snot sea cucumber)

Notes
Published surveys have not included observations of the crown-of-thorns starfish (Ananthaster planci), and this species is therefore not listed above. However, individuals have occasionally been observed at the Houtman Abrolhos.

References

Houtman Abrolhos, List of echinoderms
Echinoderms
Houtman Abrolhos
Echinoderms of the Houtman Abrolhos